Tutti gli uomini del deficiente is a soundtrack album by Italian rock band Elio e le Storie Tese made for the film with the same title.

The album sees the collaboration of Mauro Pagani, Raffaella Carrà and Lucio Dalla.

Track listing
"L'arrivo" – 0:20
"Psichedelia" – 4:25
"Ballate bastardi" – 1:45
"Yes I Love You" – 3:19
"Tell Me You Love Me" – 2:20
"Il sogno del coiffeur" – 0:41
"L'indianata" – 4:21
"Tonza patonza" – 1:09
"Risate a denti stretti" – 4:08
"Ranella impazzita" – 0:30
"Furgoni fratricidi" – 0:58
"Hommage à Violette Nozières" – 3:18
"Ci sentiamo in settimana" – 1:00
"Acido lattico" – 3:36
"Oh Yes" – 0:40
"Palla medica" – 2:17
"Tegole fratricide" – 1:05
"Super Maison" – 3:49
"Mamma non mamma" – 1:23
"Presidance®" – 3:23
"Pignoramento" – 1:07
"Maritto ogami" – 1:57

References

External links

2009 albums
Elio e le Storie Tese albums
Italian-language albums